Shan Liu is the name of several places in Hong Kong:
 Shan Liu (Sai Kung District), a village in Sai Kung District
 Shan Liu (Tai Po District), a village in Tai Po District